"I Will Give my Love an Apple" is a traditional English folk song. It was arranged by Benjamin Britten and by Herbert Howells. The song begins:

A version of the song was collected at Sherborne, Dorset, by H. E. D. Hammond in 1906; another version was printed in Journal of the Folk-Song Society, vol. 3, no. 11, 1907, p114.

References

English folk songs